Zamoshye is a rural locality (a village) in Kadnikov, Sokolsky District, Vologda Oblast, Russia. The population was 231 as of 2010. There are 7 streets.

Geography 
Zamoshye is located 40 km northeast of Sokol (the district's administrative centre) by road. Yakovlevo is the nearest rural locality.

References 

Rural localities in Sokolsky District, Vologda Oblast